Kandiramanickkam  is a village in the Thirupathur taluk of Sivagangai district in Tamil Nadu, India.

Demographics 

 census, Kandiramanickkam had a population of 2,030 with 1,040 males and 990 females. The sex ratio was 952. The literacy rate was 76.95.

References 

 

Villages in Tiruvarur district